Oscar Lini (1 October 1928 – 9 July 2016) was an Italian professional football player.

Lini played 1 game in the Serie A for A.S. Roma. He suffered a knee injury in his debut for Roma, and left the club for Serie B's U.S. Avellino. Spells with Torres Calcio, where he scored five goals in a single Serie C match, and B.P.D. Colleferro followed. He finished his career playing amateur football with U.S. Civitavecchiese.

See also
Football in Italy
List of football clubs in Italy

References

1928 births
2016 deaths
Italian footballers
Serie A players
A.S. Roma players
U.S. Avellino 1912 players
Colleferro Calcio 1937 players
Association football forwards
A.S.D. Civitavecchia 1920 players